Silves may refer to :

Europe 
 Silves, Portugal, municipality and former bishopric in Algarve, southern Portugal
 Silves (parish), a civil parish in the municipality of Silves
 Castle of Silves, a medieval castle in civil parish of Silves
 Diocese of Silves, former bishopric with see in Silves
 Silves Cathedral, its mother church in the municipality of Silves
 Taifa of Silves, medieval Muslim emirate around the city of Silves.

Americas 
 Silves, Amazonas, municipality in state of Amazonas, Brazil;
 Ilha de Silves, the island with the same name as the municipality of Silves, Amazonas